A sunrise industry is one that is new or relatively new, is growing fast and is expected to become important in the future.  Examples of sunrise industries include hydrogen fuel  production, petrochemical industry, food processing industry, space tourism, and online encyclopedias.

See also
 Sunset industry

References 

Industries (economics)